"Fortress of Islam, Heart of Asia" is an Afghan mujahideen battle song composed in 1919 by Ustad Qasim. It was adopted as the national anthem of the Islamic State of Afghanistan from 1992 to 2006.

History
During the late 1990s, the Islamic Emirate of Afghanistan under the Taliban took control over most of Afghanistan from the UN-recognized government and ruled most of the country until late 2001. The Taliban outlawed music throughout the territory that they controlled, which consisted of most of the country. As such, most of Afghanistan practically was left without a national anthem during that time, until late 2001 when the Taliban was overthrown. The song was reintroduced by the new transitional government of Afghanistan in 2002; it remained such when the Islamic Republic of Afghanistan was established in 2004 and was used by the latter until 2006.

Lyrics

See also

List of historical national anthems
Afghan National Anthem

References

External links

1992 to 2006 Afghan national anthem
1992 to 2006 Afghan national anthem

Afghan songs
National symbols of Afghanistan
Asian anthems
Historical national anthems
National anthem compositions in E-flat major